Cuddalore is connected to other parts of Tamil Nadu through rail and road networks. Frequent buses run to nearby towns.

Roads
 National Highway NH 32 (Chennai - Tindivanam - Pondicherry - Cuddalore - Chidambaram - Nagapattinam - Velankanni - Thondi - Ramanathapuram - Sayalkudi - Thoothukudi Highway) passes through Cuddalore.
 Three state highways connect Cuddalore with other parts of Tamil Nadu. The state highways originating from Cuddalore are
 SH-9, (the Cuddalore–Nellikuppam–Melpattampakkam–Panruti–Madapattu–Thirukovilur–Tiruvannamalai–Polur–Vellore–Katpadi–Chittoor road)
 NH-532, (the Cuddalore-Vadalur-Neyveli-Vriddhachalam-Veppur-Salem Road)
 SH-68, (the Cuddalore-Thiruvanthipuram-Palur-Panruti-Arasur-Thirukovilur-Sankarapuram Road)

References

Cuddalore district
Cuddalore
Cuddalore